Rezinkovia is a genus of sponges belonging to the family Lubomirskiidae.

Species:

Rezinkovia arbuscula 
Rezinkovia echinata

References

Heteroscleromorpha
Sponge genera